Château de Saint-Hubert is a French royal mansion in Le Perray-en-Yvelines.

Château de Saint-Hubert or Schloß Hubertus may also refer to:
 Château de Saint-Hubert (Chavenon), a mansion in Chavenon, Allier, France.
 Château du Grand Chavanon, also known as the Château de Saint-Hubert, historic château in Neuvy-sur-Barangeon, Cher, France.
 Schloß Hubertus, a 1934 film
 Schloß Hubertus, a 1954 film
 Schloß Hubertus, a 1973 film
 Schloss Hubertus, an 1895 novel by Ludwig Ganghofer

See also
Saint-Hubert (disambiguation)